Somdet Phra Sangharaja Chao Krommaluang Jinavaralongkorn (Vasana Vāsano), or Ariyavangsagatayana VIII (Vasana Vāsano) was the 18th Supreme Patriarch of Thailand 1973–1988 (Thai Calendar 2517–2531). He was born 1897 (2440) within the Ayutthaya province as Vasana Nilprapha. His dharma name in Pali was Vasano. He was a monk of the Wat Ratchabophit. He died in 1988, at age 90, after a reign of 14 years and 2 months.

External links
 The Supreme Patriarch's photo

Buddhism in Thailand
1897 births
1988 deaths
Thai Theravada Buddhist monks
Supreme Patriarchs of Thailand
People from Phra Nakhon Si Ayutthaya province
20th-century Buddhist monks